Nikolai Vasilyevich Sevryugin (1939–2002) was a Russian politician and governor of Tula Oblast from October 1991 (appointed by Boris Yeltsin) to March 1997.  He was charged with taking bribes after he left office, but postponements of the case, including for his declining health, led to his death before any outcome on the charges against him.

References

Governors of Tula Oblast
Russian anti-communists
1939 births
2002 deaths
People from Mikhaylovsky District, Ryazan Oblast
Members of the Federation Council of Russia (1996–2000)